Clayton Byrne (born 12 February 1972 in Guildford, Western Australia) is an Australian baseball player. He represented Australia at the 2000 Summer Olympics.

References

External links

1972 births
Baseball people from Western Australia
Olympic baseball players of Australia
Australian baseball players
Baseball players at the 2000 Summer Olympics
Living people
Rochester Red Wings players
Kane County Cougars players
Bluefield Orioles players
Albany Polecats players
Bowie Baysox players
Frederick Keys players
High Desert Mavericks players
Bridgeport Bluefish players